Shake, Rattle & Roll X is a 2008 Filipino fantasy horror anthology film produced by Regal Entertainment and directed by Micheal Tuviera and Topel Lee. It is the tenth installment of the Shake, Rattle & Roll film series and the highest-grossing film in the series. The film is an official entry to the 34th Metro Manila Film Festival. The film was a box office success, and Robert Villar won the MMFF Award for Best Child Performer.

The eleventh installment, Shake, Rattle & Roll XI, was released in 2009.

Plot

"Emergency"
On one windy night, Jay (JC De Vera) and Dennis (Janus Del Prado) were traveling along a dark highway, accidentally running over a pregnant woman (Mylene Dizon) crossing the street. They saw that she had a miscarriage, so they immediately carried her to the hospital.

The mysterious woman was accompanied by other patients: a gay man named Julius (John Lapus) who was complaining about fever, an English-speaker named Eric (Eri Neeman) who keeps complaining about the hospital's defective apparatus and a "tortured" and badly injured man who immediately recognized the woman. He attempted to swipe her with his whip, but it only lead to his death.

Hospital radiologist Dr. Sarah (Roxanne Guinoo) examines the woman using an ultrasound scanner. During the examination, a very eerie sound wailed through the air. They discovered that the infant died while inside the woman's womb. Meanwhile, Sarah went to the bathroom where it was revealed that she was apparently pregnant.

The woman then was transferred into an isolation room. The hospital's administrator, Dr. Ignacio (Perry Escaño) became skeptical about the true nature of the woman. They speculated that she might not be human, so he decided to promote this idea which enraged Sarah.

Back in the isolation room, the woman had a dream of a man beating her with a magic whip: it was the same man who attempted her life as mentioned earlier. She gave a very shrill cry; a scream that gave evidence she was not human but an aswang, a vampire or flesh eating witch in Filipino mythology. Together with her husband (Wendell Ramos), who was also a witch, along with their race, they seek vengeance on humanity, ready to invade the hospital. The hospital tenants brace themselves for the incoming attack. Dr. Ignacio is the first to be killed by the aswang husband after terminating Dennis.

Jay became aware of the events happening outside. He, Sarah and the others immediately evacuate to the upper floors as the witch relentlessly break in, killing patients including Julius and Erick. The others hid in the stock room while Jay rescues a young girl from the aswang wife.

Dennis, who had been separated from the team, thought that chemicals can kill the aswangs but was proven wrong: holy water can. They formulated a plan: Jay and Sarah ward the beasts off while hospital chaplain Father Miguel (Cris Daluz) and Dennis bless the water tank with holy water.

Sarah and Jay were trapped in a locked corridor, with the beasts in pursuit. They use a defibrillator to electrocute the aswangs. At that moment, Father Miguel and Dennis reached the tank, and Sarah jokingly revealed to Jay that she was pregnant.

At this point, the monsters turn into more powerful creatures and launch their final attack. Father Miguel, meanwhile, blesses the water in the tank, tainting it with holy water. While Jay is being attacked by the creatures, Sarah then uses a fire-lit boom to activate the fire sprinkler system to destroy the aswangs. At the end of the story, it is revealed that the baby was on the hospital's rooftop, thus avoiding getting soaked in holy water. It opens its eyes and unleashing a final jumpscare.

"Class Picture"
A terrified young woman running through the halls of San Selino College at night sees horrific visions of a dead student wearing an old school uniform. When she finds herself clad in the same uniform, she becomes more terrified when she is scourged by an unseen force while a diabolical female laughter is heard. The young woman dies after being stoned and having her forehead sliced by a razor being held by an unknown female hand with a sleeve of a nun's habit.

Joy (Kim Chiu), Lui (Gerald Anderson) and their 8 friends are graduating college students of San Selino who spend their weekend in the campus, being assigned to prepare an exhibit in exchange for lifting their organization's suspension and their clearance for graduation. On their first night, one of their classmates, Nicole (Niña Jose), presumably the young woman in the opening, disappeared without a trace.

Waking up from a nightmare, Joy confesses to her friends of what happened the previous night; hours before midnight, she picked a mysterious class picture named "Rubi 1898" in the school's storage room. The picture shows an all-female class with a nun seated at the center. The second incident of this picture involves Blue (Eda Nolan) and Pinky (IC Mendoza) when they dumped some garbage. Blue took a look at the nun in the picture wherein the nun smiled. Suddenly, she was unknowingly captured by the same unknown force and she too, vanished. She finds herself clad in the old school uniform seen in the nightmare at  the beginning. The spirit then killed Blue by apparently tearing her arms apart when she was stuck in a chair of a classroom.

Joy discovers sinister Chavacano writing in a classroom window, written in blood, stating "No me mires fijamente". When the group goes to the library, they try to translate the blood graffiti only to fail at first. Scanning the yearbooks for information, they find "Rubi" was a class section supervised by Sister Maria Belonia (Jean Garcia). They also discover a similar class picture of the same section with a male teacher standing at the middle in place of Belonia, revealed as Virgilio, who became the substitute adviser during Belonia's absence. In the same yearbook, Joy discovers three students, namely Crisel, Sabel, and Adela, who were the missing students of the "Rubi" section.

The group finally discovers from the computer translator that the Chavacano words mean "Do not Stare". Little did they know, that the "Rubi" picture Joy picked up, is a possessed photograph and that the bloody writing was a warning, stating that anyone who looks at the nun, through the cursed picture will disappear and die.

The dark answer is revealed at this point; Belonia must seek three students from them. Lui looks at the picture and spots their group mates in the photo; Nicole and Blue. Also at this point, Nicole is revealed to be the young woman in the opening scene. Joy reveals that she is the next to be taken for accidentally looking at the nun before she is abducted by the same unknown force, now revealed to be Sis. Maria Belonia herself, an evil nun teacher who haunts the school in return for a terrible oath done in the past; her responsibility of the death of the institution's students in the Spanish Colonial Period.

Joy runs through the school's hallways in order to escape the wrath of Sis. Belonia. She sees the three missing students in a room being scourged by Belonia but fails to free the trio when she is glanced at by Belonia. It is revealed that Sister Belonia tortures students either for being disobedient or making the smallest of mistakes. Crisel, Sabel, and Adela, in retaliation, wrote a letter to the headmistress nun, Mother Agnes, to report Belonia's actions. Mother Agnes, upon learning this, reprimands Sis. Belonia for her brutal and torturous manners of disciplining the three girls and her class. When the day for the class picture arrived, the headmistress realizes that their class have the aforementioned three girls missing. She then suspends Belonia from San Selino (this later explains why she utters the words often) and tells her that she cannot come back until the three students are found. In return, she committed suicide but not before swearing that she will complete her class' picture, (which explains her vengeance to take three students). Later on, she finds herself now clad in the old school uniform from the opening scene and when Blue was abducted by the evil nun.

Lui and Greg (Prince Stefan) chased Joy but arrive too late during the final confrontation at the school's theater hall/auditorium as the doors were tightly shut and locked by the angered spirit of Belonia, who was ready to take Joy. Lui's attempts to tear the picture proved impervious as the nun's curse remained in the picture.

Realizing this, Joy asks the help from the spirits of the three missing students. The ghosts of Crisel, Sabel and Adela reappear and tore the picture apart, banishing Belonia to hell as the ghostly trio peacefully then departs for the Afterlife. With all the terror ended, the group finished and inaugurated the exhibit, but were suspended for unexplainable loss of their classmates, a fact that made their school status parallel to Sis. Belonia, Crisel, Sabel, and Adela. The episode ends when the camera slowly moves toward the class picture with Sr. Belonia smiling to the audience.

"Nieves the Engkanto Slayer"
Nieves (Nye-ves) (Marian Rivera) is a happy-go-lucky but a fierce engkantolarya (Engkanto slayer). While on a walk at the forest one day, she was pursued by an engkanto, Hagnaya (Marco Alcaraz). Saying that she has got no crush on him, she vanquished the engkanto.

It was revealed that Nieves lives with her husband Adonis (Pekto), a handsome man and engkanto heartthrob. But one stormy night, the young man was intentionally kidnapped by an engkanto. With this, Nieves formally resigned her job.

Meanwhile, a family from Manila spends their vacation in a new house bound by a large tree. Celso (Mart Escudero), however, was brainwashed and was forced to cut down the tree, thus creating a new problem for his family.

Junie (Robert Villar), Celso's little nephew, went to see Nieves, along with a young girl named Kaysee (Jennica Garcia) after gaining information from Aling Tasing (Malou Crisologo). However, Nieves reluctantly welcomes them, but after seeing a begging Junie, she offered them to be trained as soon as possible.

Kaysee and Junie trekked back to Nieves's home when they were welcomed by the townsfolk, complaining about the new attacks of dwarves, elves, kapres, etc. The engkantolarya, still reluctant to resume her job, finally agreed to continue her post. In a short montage, it shows Nieves training the pair, while she and Junie encounter an engkanto.

Junie's parents (Luis Alandy and Desiree Del Valle) seek help from Nieves when something happened wrong again: Celso's illness worsened. Nieves explained why the young man fell ill: he cut the tree in the backyard, which was the home of Hagnaya and his wife, Wai Lana (Iwa Moto). It was also revealed that the voice that brainwashed Celso was the engkanto queen herself, Acacia (Diana Zubiri).

Nieves negotiated with Wai Lana and Hagnaya personally, explaining that Celso did not mean to cut down the tree and offered them that she will help find their new home. On the contrary, Kaysee, who went with a walk with Junie one day, revealed herself as Acacia.

Sensing danger, Junie ran to Nieves and told her what he saw. The engkanto slayer was given a special suit blessed by the good engkanto clan. As they speak, Acacia ensnared the townsfolk to her lair.

Nieves confronted Acacia while Junie snapped the townsfolk out of the trance. As the two ladies fight, it was revealed that Acacia had Adonis held hostage under a hill. In anger, the engkanto queen tortured the engkantolarya mercilessly. Enraged, the young slayer threw a repellent in the air while Junie hit it with his sling-stone, killing Acacia in the process.

With Adonis back, Nieves and the townsfolk rejoiced.

Cast

Emergency
Roxanne Guinoo as Dr. Sarah
JC De Vera as Jay
Mylene Dizon as Aswang Wife
Wendell Ramos as Aswang Husband
John Lapus as Julius
Janus Del Prado as Dennis
Denise Laurel as Emily
Julia Chua as Yumi
Eri Neeman as Ehrick
Cris Dalus as Fr. Miguel
Dido dela Paz as Dr. Ignacio
Therese Carlos as Yumi's mother
Johnny Samson as Ehrick's cousin

Class Picture
Kim Chiu as Joy
Gerald Anderson as Lui
Jean Garcia as Sister Maria Belonia
IC Mendoza as Pinky
Erich Gonzales as Anna
Stef Prescott as Pam
Charles Christianson as Tupak
Eda Nolan as Blue
Prince Stefan as Greg
Andrea Torres as Issa
Niña Jose as Nicole
Ysa Villar as Sabel Mercado
Cristine Joy Velasco as Crisel de Vera
Czarina Gonzales as Adela Villafar
Lollie Mara as Mother Agnes
Carmen del Rosario as Manang/Janitress
Rosette Alanganan as Sister Maria Belonia's Double
Raymond Firmo Narag as Security Guard 1
Carlito Casas as Security Guard 2

Nieves the Engkanto Slayer
Marian Rivera as Nieves
Diana Zubiri  as Acacia
Jennica Garcia as Kaysee
Mart Escudero as Celso
Luis Alandy as Dario
Desiree Del Valle as May Ann
Iwa Moto as Wai Lana
Marco Alcaraz as Hagnaya
Robert Villar as Junie
Pekto as Adonis
Malou Crisologo as Aling Tasing
Raul Dillio as Kapre
Kristel Fulgar as Jennylyn
Antonette Garcia as Agnes/Tindera
Rowena Vargas as Tindera
Sabrina Man as Kid 1
Thalia Delos Reyes as Kid 2

Reception

Critical response
Shake, Rattle and Roll X was viewed as a "mixed bag of stories that range in quality from poor to somewhat okay." The first story, "Emergency" lacked narrative, and had unnecessary character details that affected the pace. "Class Picture" was viewed as having strong Asian horror elements although its script failed to keep pace with the direction. The last entry, "Nieves" is described to be entertaining due to its solid script, carefully blended mythology with humor and an unforgettable performance from Marian Rivera. What made it unique was its use of comedy, which made it comparable to Buffy The Vampire Slayer.

Box office
₱13,100,000 (December 25, 2008)
₱22,900,000 (December 26, 2008)
₱35,400,000 (December 28, 2008
₱40,500,000 (December 29, 2008)
₱45,700,000 (December 31, 2008)
₱68,000,000 (January 7, 2009)

Accolades
Robert Villar was awarded for Best Child Performer for playing the role of Junie in the film.

See also
Shake, Rattle & Roll (film series)
List of ghost films

References

External links

2008 films
2008 comedy films
2008 comedy horror films
2008 horror films
Filipino-language films
Philippine comedy horror films
Philippine horror films
Regal Entertainment films
10
2000s Tagalog-language films
2000s English-language films
Films directed by Mike Tuviera
Films directed by Topel Lee